Inhuman Rampage is the third studio album by English power metal band DragonForce, released first on 28 December 2005 in Japan, and 9 January 2006 elsewhere, through Victor Entertainment and Roadrunner Records, respectively. Its first single, "Through the Fire and Flames", has received rock radio and Fuse TV airplay, and has appeared as a playable track on the video games Guitar Hero III: Legends of Rock and Rocksmith 2014 Edition – Remastered. It is the band's first album to feature harsh vocals, which were recorded by Demoniac vocalist Lindsay Dawson; the album is also the last to feature bassist Adrian Lambert, who left the band in 2005 and was replaced by Frédéric Leclercq before the album's release.

In the United States, Inhuman Rampage reached No. 1 on the Billboard Heatseekers chart and No. 103 on the Billboard 200 chart. The album was certified Silver by the British Phonographic Industry for selling over 60,000 copies in the United Kingdom and has been certified Gold in the United States. Metal Hammer included the album in their 2016 list of ten essential power metal albums and Loudwire ranked it as the 24th best power metal album of all time.

Production
Recording for the album took place at Thin Ice Studios in Surrey and LamerLuser Studios in London between February and September 2005. During the recording of "Through the Fire and Flames", guitarist Herman Li snapped one of his guitar strings. Despite this, the band decided to keep this recording and left it on the final album version. It was then mixed at Thin Ice Studios by Karl Groom, Sam Totman, Li and Vadim Pruzhanov and engineered by Karl Groom and Li. The mastering was performed by Eberhard Köhler at Powerplay Mastering in Berlin, Germany. A music transcription book was released for the album on 15 September 2008 by Hal Leonard Publishing Corporation.

Track listing
"The Flame of Youth" contains a sample of Ryu's theme from Street Fighter. The special edition physical copy of the album contained a bonus DVD with the music videos for "Through the Fire and Flames" and "Operation Ground and Pound", a compilation of tour footage entitled "DragonForce Backstage Rockumentary", and on 2007 re-release, a video of the band's performance of the song "My Spirit Will Go On", from their previous album Sonic Firestorm, at the Metal Hammer Golden Gods Awards in 2006.

Personnel
DragonForce
ZP Theart – lead vocals
Herman Li – guitars, backing vocals
Sam Totman – guitars, backing vocals
Vadim Pruzhanov – keyboards, piano, backing vocals
Dave Mackintosh – drums, backing vocals

Guest musicians
Adrian Lambert – bass
Clive Nolan – backing vocals
Lindsay Dawson – unclean vocals

Production
Karl Groom – mixing, engineering
Eberhard Köhler – mastering
Chie Kimoto, Daniel Bérard – artwork
Marisa Jacobi – graphic design
Axel Jusseit – studio photography
Julie Brown, Johan Eriksson – live photography

Charts

Weekly charts

Year-end charts

Certifications

Release history

References

External links
Inhuman Rampage on the official DragonForce website.

DragonForce albums
2005 albums
2006 albums
Roadrunner Records albums
Noise Records albums